Downtown Indianapolis is a neighborhood area and the central business district of Indianapolis, Indiana, United States. Downtown is bordered by Interstate 65, Interstate 70, and the White River, and is situated near the geographic center of Marion County. Downtown has grown from the original 1821 town plat—often referred to as the Mile Square—to encompass a broader geographic area of central Indianapolis, containing several smaller historic neighborhoods.

Downtown Indianapolis is the cultural, political, and economic center of the Indianapolis metropolitan area. Downtown Indianapolis anchors the city's burgeoning tourism and hospitality sector, home to nearly 8,000 hotel rooms and several of the city's major sporting and event facilities. Downtown contains numerous historic districts and properties, most of the city's memorials and monuments, performing arts venues, and museums. Since its founding in 1820, the seats of Indianapolis's local administration and Indiana's state government have been located Downtown. Downtown Indianapolis is also home to the highest density of commercial office space and employment in the state of Indiana.

Location and boundaries

When Indianapolis was founded in 1820, the new capital city was planned to occupy an area of  adjacent to the White River and near the geographic center of Marion County. The plat included eastern and western "anchors": the Indiana Statehouse (west) and the Indianapolis City Market and Marion County Courthouse (east), respectively. As the population increased and the city matured, the original plat continued to densify, developing into the region's central business district.

The city's historical core and present-day central business district is sometimes referred to as the "Mile Square". However, the Downtown "neighborhood area" defines a broader geography, incorporating an area bounded by 16th Street and Interstate 65 (north), Interstate 65/70 (east), Interstate 70 (south), and the White River (west). Downtown is generally bisected into four quadrants, divided by Meridian Street (north to south) and Washington Street (east to west).(about 7 square miles)

Downtown Indianapolis is sited on flat terrain near the confluence of the White River and Fall Creek. Pogue's Run, a smaller tributary of the White River, flows beneath Downtown. The waterway was channeled into a sanitary tunnel in 1914.

Neighborhoods and districts

Downtown Indianapolis contains 36 apartment buildings that are listed on the National Register of Historic Places in the Apartments and Flats of Downtown Indianapolis Thematic Resources. Entries in italics denote designated cultural districts.

 Canal and White River State Park
 Chatham–Arch
 Cole-Noble District
 Flanner House Homes
 Fletcher Place
 Holy Rosary–Danish Church Historic District
 Indiana Avenue
 Indiana World War Memorial Historic District
 Lockefield Gardens
 Lockerbie Square Historic District
 Market East
 Mass Ave
 Old Southside Historic District
 Ransom Place Historic District
 St. Joseph Neighborhood Historic District
 Washington Street–Monument Circle Historic District
 Wholesale District

History

19th century

Downtown Indianapolis dates to the city's founding as the state of Indiana's new capital in 1820 near the east bank of the White River. The state legislature appointed Alexander Ralston and Elias Pym Fordham to survey and design a town plan for Indianapolis, which was platted in 1821. Ralston's original plan for Indianapolis called for a town of  bounded by North, East, South, and West streets (although they were not named at that time), with Governor's Circle, a large circular commons, at the center of town.

Ralston's grid pattern with wide roads and public squares extended outward from the four blocks adjacent to the Circle, and also included four diagonal streets, later renamed as avenues. Public squares were reserved for government and community use, but not all of these squares were used for this intended purpose. Ralston altered the grid pattern in the southeast quadrant to accommodate the flow of Pogue's Run, but a plat created in 1831 changed his original design and established a standard grid there as well.

Ralston's basic street plan is still evident in present-day Downtown Indianapolis. Streets in the original plat were named after states that were part of the United States when Indianapolis was initially planned, with the addition of Michigan, which was a U.S. territory at that time. Tennessee and Mississippi Streets were renamed Capitol and Senate Avenues in 1895 after several state government buildings were built west of the Circle near the Indiana Statehouse. There are a few other exceptions to the early street names. The city's address numbering system begins at the intersection of Washington and Meridian streets. Meridian and Market Streets intersect the Circle. Few street improvements were made in the 1820s and 1830s; sidewalks did not appear until 1839 or 1840.

In the last half of the nineteenth century, when the city's population soared from 8,091 in 1850 to 169,164 in 1900, urban development expanded in all directions as Indianapolis experienced a building boom and transitioned from an agricultural community to an industrial center. Some of the city's most iconic structures were built during this period, including several that have survived to the present day in Downtown: the Soldiers' and Sailors' Monument (1888, dedicated 1902), the Indiana Statehouse (1888), Union Station (1888), and the Das Deutsche Haus (1898), among others.

20th century
Following World War II, expansion of the American middle class, suburbanization, and declining manufacturing employment greatly impacted Downtown Indianapolis, similar to most U.S. central business districts at this time. Urban renewal projects of this era hastened the central business district's decline, particularly the clearance of working-class neighborhoods. The neighborhoods surrounding Indiana Avenue, the center of the city's African American community, were particularly impacted. The establishment of the Indiana University – Purdue University Indianapolis (IUPUI) campus in 1969 and the construction of Interstate 65 and Interstate 70 in the 1960s and 1970s resulted in large-scale displacement of African Americans.

The loss of population and activity Downtown prompted civic leaders to plan for economic development and revitalization of the area. Among the first projects was the opening of Market Square Arena, which served as home to the Indiana Pacers and host to numerous concerts and other sporting events. The success of Market Square Arena helped persuade decision-makers to make Downtown the center of an aggressive sports tourism strategy. Throughout the 1980s, $122 million in public and private funding built several athletic facilities Downtown, including the Indianapolis Tennis Center, Indiana University Natatorium, Carroll Track and Soccer Stadium, and the Hoosier Dome. The latter project helped secure the 1984 relocation of the Baltimore Colts, the 1987 Pan American Games, and scores of subsequent athletic events of national and international interest.

Modern skyscraper construction catapulted Downtown office and commercial space in the 1980s. A building boom, lasting from 1982 to 1990, saw the construction of six of the city's ten tallest buildings. These included OneAmerica Tower (1982), Fifth Third Bank Tower (1983), Capital Center South Tower (1987), BMO Plaza (1988), Market Tower (1988), 300 North Meridian (1989), and the tallest, Salesforce Tower (1990).

The non-profit Downtown Indy, Inc. was established in 1993 to help promote economic development, beautification, and program events. Reinvestment continued through the 1990s, with the continued buildout of White River State Park museums and attractions, development of the Canal Walk, Circle Centre Mall (1995), Victory Field (1996), and Gainbridge Fieldhouse (1999).

21st century

The city's successful sports tourism campaign provided local leadership with a template for increasing Downtown's capacity to host conventions and trade shows. Two of the city's tallest buildings to be completed in the 21st century, Conrad Indianapolis (2006) and the JW Marriott Indianapolis (2011), are hotels. Following the opening of Lucas Oil Stadium in 2008, the Indiana Convention Center completed its largest expansion in 2011.

In the 2010s, Downtown experienced increased demand for housing. Numerous mixed-use and apartment buildings were developed during this time. According to Downtown Indy, Inc., the number of apartment units Downtown has increased 61 percent from 2011 to 2015, with more than 50 percent of new development occurring inside the Mile Square. In 2010, the population of Downtown was 14,664; by 2020, the population had increased to 22,412.

Economy

Downtown is the densest employment cluster in the state of Indiana. According to Downtown Indy, Inc., in 2021, there were about 154,500 workers. According to Colliers International, the central business district commercial office market contained  of office space, with a direct vacancy rate of 16.9 percent in 2017. Downtown Indianapolis is home to two of the city's three Fortune 500 companies: health insurance company Elevance Health and pharmaceutical company Eli Lilly and Company. Other prominent companies based Downtown include: Cummins Global Distribution Headquarters; media conglomerate Emmis Communications; financial services holding company OneAmerica; the National Collegiate Athletic Association (NCAA); local newspaper The Indianapolis Star; and fast food restaurant chain Steak 'n Shake.

Tourism

The hospitality industry is an increasingly vital sector to the Indianapolis economy, especially Downtown. According to Visit Indy, 28.2 million visitors generated $4.9 billion in 2015, the fourth straight year of record growth. Indianapolis has long been a sport tourism destination, but has more recently relied on conventions. The Indiana Convention Center (ICC) and Lucas Oil Stadium are considered mega convention center facilities, with a combined  of exhibition space. ICC is connected to 12 hotels and 4,700 hotel rooms, the most of any U.S. convention center. In 2008, the facility hosted 42 national conventions with an attendance of 317,815; in 2014, it hosted 106 for an attendance of 635,701.

According to Downtown Indy, Inc., there are 34 hotels with a total of 7,839 hotel rooms. Most hotels are clustered in the blocks immediately adjacent to the Indiana Convention Center in Downtown's southeast quadrant. Notable hotels include:
 The Columbia Club
 Conrad Indianapolis
 Hilton Garden Inn Indianapolis Downtown
 Hilton Indianapolis
 Hyatt Regency Indianapolis
 Indianapolis Marriott Downtown
 JW Marriott Indianapolis
 Le Méridien Indianapolis Hotel
 Omni Severin Hotel

Attractions

Recent developments in downtown Indianapolis include the construction of new mid- to high-rise buildings and the $275 million expansion of the Indiana Convention Center completed in 2011. After 12 years of planning and six years of construction, the Indianapolis Cultural Trail: A Legacy of Gene & Marilyn Glick officially opened in 2013. A 2015 Indiana University Policy Institute report found assessed property values along the Cultural Trail increased by over $1 billion from 2008 to 2014.

Bars and restaurants

Downtown's main nightlife areas are located on Meridian Street near Georgia Street and along Massachusetts Avenue. A variety of nightclubs, live music venues, bars, and restaurants are clustered along South Meridian and Georgia streets between Monument Circle and Lucas Oil Stadium. Massachusetts Avenue, or Mass Ave, lies northeast of the central business district and is lined with high-end local bars and restaurants. Easley Winery and Sun King Brewery are located on College Avenue on the east side of Downtown.

Some of the nightclubs and bars in the Wholesale District include Slippery Noodle Inn, Howl at the Moon, Tiki Bob's, Claddagh Irish Pub, Kilroy's Bar and Grill, St. Elmo Steak House, and a cigar lounge called Nicky Blaines. Mass Ave bars include The Eagle, Burnside Inn, Bazbeaux Pizza, Tavern on the Point, Chatterbox, Mesh on Mass, FortyFive Degrees, and Metro. Mass Ave also has various European bars that include MacNiven's (Scottish), Chatham Tap (English), and The Rathskeller (German).

Entertainment

Athletics

The city's professional sports clubs and major athletic venues are located south of Washington Street, including Gainbridge Fieldhouse (home to the Indiana Fever and Pacers), Lucas Oil Stadium (home to the Indianapolis Colts), and Victory Field (home to the Indianapolis Indians). The remaining sports facilities are located in the northwestern section of Downtown on the campus of IUPUI.

 Gainbridge Fieldhouse
 Indiana Pacers
 Indiana Fever
 Indiana University Natatorium
 Indianapolis Colts
 Indianapolis Indians
 IU Michael A. Carroll Track & Soccer Stadium
 IUPUI Jaguars
 Indy Eleven
 Lucas Oil Stadium
 Victory Field

Music and theater

 Athenæum (Das Deutsche Haus)
 The Cabaret
 The District Theatre
 Hilbert Circle Theatre
 Indiana Theatre
 Indiana Repertory Theatre
 Indianapolis Artsgarden
 Indianapolis Symphony Orchestra
 IndyFringe Basile and Indy Eleven Theatres
 Madam Walker Legacy Center
 Old National Centre
 The Pavilion at Pan Am
 Phoenix Theatre
 TCU Amphitheater at White River State Park

Monuments and memorials

 Indiana 9/11 Memorial
 Indiana Law Enforcement and Firefighters Memorial
 Indiana World War Memorial Plaza
 Medal of Honor Memorial
 Peirce Geodetic Monument
 Soldiers' and Sailors' Monument
 USS Indianapolis National Memorial
 Wooden's Legacy
Note: For an overview and complete list of all memorials and monuments on the grounds of Indiana Government Center, see Indiana Statehouse Public Art Collection.

Museums

 Colonel Eli Lilly Civil War Museum
 Crispus Attucks High School and Museum
 Eiteljorg Museum of American Indians and Western Art
 Emil A. Blackmore Museum of The American Legion
 Indiana Historical Society
 Indiana State Library and Historical Bureau
 Indiana State Museum
 Indiana World War Memorial Military Museum
 Indianapolis Firefighters Museum
 James Whitcomb Riley Museum Home
 Kurt Vonnegut Museum and Library
 Masonic Library and Museum of Indiana
 NCAA Hall of Champions
 Rhythm! Discovery Center

Other

 Central Library
 Circle Centre Mall
 Indiana Convention Center
 Indianapolis Catacombs
 Indianapolis City Market
 Scottish Rite Cathedral

Parks, plazas, and squares

The Indiana World War Memorial Plaza encompasses three distinct downtown greenspaces: American Legion Mall, Veterans Memorial Plaza, and University Park. The Indianapolis Canal Walk also includes three pocket parks: Community Service Plaza, Vermont Street Plazas, and Walnut Street Commons. Bicentennial Unity Plaza, the newest public space Downtown, is anticipated to open by the end of 2022.

Note: Entries in italics denote privately-owned parks and plazas or those not under the management of the State of Indiana or the City of Indianapolis.

 Babe Denny Park
 Ball Nurses' Sunken Garden and Convalescent Park
 Bicentennial Plaza
 Bicentennial Unity Plaza
 Bill Gray Plaza
 Charles L. Whistler Memorial Plaza
 Chatham Commons
 Cummins Central Plaza
 Edna Balz Lacy Family Park
 Fallen Firefighters Memorial Plaza
 Hudnut Commons
 Indianapolis Cultural Trail: A Legacy of Gene & Marilyn Glick
 Lt. Jr. Gr. Graham Edward Martin Park
 Matthew R. Gutwein Commonground at Eskenazi Health
 Merrill Street Pocket Park
 Military Park
 Monument Circle
 Pan American Plaza
 Pathways to Peace Garden
 Presidential Place Park
 Ransom Place Neighborhood Park
 Richard G. Lugar Plaza
 South Street Square Park
 White River Greenway
 White River State Park

Public art

Government

As the state capital, Indianapolis is the seat of Indiana's state government. The city has hosted the capital since its move from Corydon in 1825. The Indiana Statehouse, located Downtown, houses the executive, legislative, and judicial branches of state government, including the offices of the Governor and Lieutenant Governor of Indiana, the Indiana General Assembly, and the Indiana Supreme Court. Most state departments and agencies are located in Indiana Government Centers North and South.

The consolidated city-county government of Indianapolis and Marion County (known as Unigov) is also located Downtown at the City-County Building. The City-County Building houses the executive, legislative, and judicial branches of local government, as well as municipal departments, and the Indianapolis Metropolitan Police Department.

Federal field offices are located in the Birch Bayh Federal Building and United States Courthouse (which houses the United States District Court for the Southern District of Indiana) and the Minton-Capehart Federal Building, both located Downtown.

Infrastructure

Education

Downtown is home to Indiana University – Purdue University Indianapolis (IUPUI), the third largest campus in the state based on enrollment, with 30,105 students. IUPUI contains two colleges and 18 schools, including the Herron School of Art and Design, Robert H. McKinney School of Law, School of Dentistry, and the Indiana University School of Medicine, the largest medical school in the U.S.

Indianapolis Public Schools (IPS) is headquartered Downtown in the John Morton-Finney Educational Service Center. , IPS was the second largest public school district in Indiana, serving nearly 30,000 students.

Located Downtown, the Indianapolis Public Library's Central Library is the hub of the public library's 23 branch system, which served 4.2 million patrons and a circulation of 15.9 million materials in 2014.

Healthcare

Downtown's northwest quadrant is home to the largest cluster of healthcare facilities in the region. Located on the IUPUI campus, the Indiana University Health Medical Center encompasses the Indiana University School of Medicine, University Hospital, and Riley Hospital for Children. This area is roughly bounded by 10th Street (north), Michigan Street (south), University Boulevard (east), and Riley Hospital Drive (west). Indiana University Health Methodist Hospital, the largest facility in the state, is located on 16th Street, immediately outside Downtown in the Near Northside neighborhood area. The city's primary public medical centers, Sidney & Lois Eskenazi Hospital and the Richard L. Roudebush VA Medical Center, are situated immediately west of the Indiana University Medical Center in an area bounded by 10th Street (north), Michigan Street (south), Eskenazi Avenue (east), and Porto Alegre Street (west).

Transportation

Downtown Indianapolis has been the regional transportation hub for central Indiana since its establishment. The first major federally funded highway in the U.S., the National Road (now Washington Street), reached Indianapolis in 1836, followed by the railroad in 1847. Indianapolis Union Station opened in 1853 as the world's first union station. Citizen's Street and Railway Company was established in 1864, operating the city's first mule-drawn streetcar line. Opened in 1904 on West Market Street, the Indianapolis Traction Terminal was the largest interurban station in the world, handling 500 trains daily and 7 million passengers annually. Ultimately doomed by the automobile, the terminal closed in 1941, followed by the streetcar system in 1957.

Two of the region's four interstate highways (Interstate 65 and Interstate 70) form an "inner loop" on the north, east, and south sides of downtown Indianapolis. I-65 and I-70 radiate from downtown to connect with the "outer loop," a beltway called Interstate 465.

IndyGo operates the city's public transit network, with downtown Indianapolis serving as the region's hub and spoke origin. In 2016, the Julia M. Carson Transit Center opened as the downtown hub for 27 of its 31 bus routes. The Central Indiana Regional Transportation Authority (CIRTA) is a quasi-governmental agency that operates three public buses from the Julia M. Carson Transit Center to employment centers in Plainfield and Whitestown.

Downtown Indianapolis continues to be the city's intercity transportation hub. Amtrak provides intercity rail service via the Cardinal, which makes three weekly trips between New York City and Chicago. Union Station served about 30,000 passengers in 2015. Three intercity bus service providers stop in the city: Greyhound Lines and Burlington Trailways (via Union Station), and Megabus (via City Market).

The Indianapolis Airport Authority operates the Indianapolis Downtown Heliport, which opened for public use in 1979.

Utilities
AES Indiana, the city's electricity provider, is headquartered on Monument Circle. Citizens Energy Group's Perry K. Generating Station burns natural gas to produce steam to provide heat and hot water to 200 customers in Downtown's district heating system.

See also
List of tallest buildings in Indianapolis

Notes

References

External links

Downtown Indy, Inc.
City of Indianapolis
Visit Indy

Tourist attractions in Indianapolis
Neighborhoods in Indianapolis
Economy of Indianapolis
Indianapolis metropolitan area
Indianapolis